The AfrAsia Bank Mauritius Open is a men's professional golf tournament, co-sanctioned by the European Tour and Sunshine Tour, as well as formerly being sanctioned by the Asian Tour. It began in 2015 and was played at Heritage Golf Club in Bel-Ombre, Mauritius. In 2016 and 2018 the tournament was held at Anahita Golf Club, returning to Heritage Golf Club in 2017 and in 2019. The 2015 and 2016 events were played in May but in 2017 it was moved to December and was part of the 2018 European Tour schedule.

In the second round of the inaugural tournament in 2015, Spain's Javier Colomo made a hole-in-one the par-4 9th hole, the first par-four ace in the history of all three co-sanctioning tours. It was his final hole of the day, and he had needed birdie or better to make the cut.

In August 2022, it was confirmed that the tournament would return later that year in December, the first time in a two year hiatus.

Heritage Golf Club in Bel-Ombre is due to open a new course in December 2023; La Réserve Golf Links, designed by Peter Matkovich. It will host the 2023 tournament.

Winners

Notes

References

External links
Coverage on the European Tour's official site
Coverage on the Sunshine Tour's official site
Coverage on the Asian Tour's official site

European Tour events
Former Asian Tour events
Sunshine Tour events
Golf tournaments in Mauritius
Recurring sporting events established in 2015
Recurring sporting events disestablished in 2019
2015 establishments in Mauritius
2019 disestablishments in Mauritius